The United Kingdom Royal Commission on Railway Gauges was held in 1845 to choose between the  broad gauge of the Great Western Railway and its associated companies and the so-called narrow gauge (now known as standard gauge) of  that had been installed in most of the rest of the country.  The situation in Ireland, where there were three gauges, was also considered.

The Great Western Railway was allowed to continue with its broad gauge.

Narrow gauges 
Unlike Italy and France, which regulated the choice of narrow gauges, Britain did not, resulting in a large number of alternatives, including:

  – earliest use 1836
  – 1879
  – 1859
  – 1884
  – 1873
  – 1863
 several other rarely used gauges.

See also 
 Regulating the Gauge of Railways Act 1846
 Rail gauge in Australia
 Royal Commission

References 

1845 in the United Kingdom
British Royal Commissions